Bricklin may refer to:

Bricklin SV-1, a sports car built in Canada
Bricklin EVX/LS, a fuel efficient vehicle planned for 2010

Surname 
Dan Bricklin (born 1951), co-programmer of VisiCalc
Malcolm Bricklin (born 1939), businessman who built the Bricklin SV-1 car